Carina may refer to:

Places

Australia 
 Carina, Queensland, a suburb in Brisbane
 Carina Heights, Queensland, a suburb in Brisbane
 Carina, Victoria, a locality in Mildura

Serbia 
 Carina, Osečina, a village in the Kolubara District

People
 Carina (name), a given name (including a list of people with the name)
 Carina, a pet form of the given name Cara
 Carina, a Latinization of Cairenn, said to be the mother of Niall of the Nine Hostages

Anatomy 
 Carina, the scientific name for an anatomical structure resembling a keel, such as the large keel on the breastbone in birds
 Carina of trachea, the point at which the trachea branches to form the two mainstem bronchi

Astronomy
 Carina (Chinese astronomy)
 Carina (constellation), a constellation
 Carina Dwarf, a dwarf galaxy orbiting the Milky Way
 Carina Nebula (NGC 3372)

Arts, entertainment, and media
 "Carina" (Corrado Lojacono song), a 1958 song covered by Sophia Loren, Dean Martin and Cliff Richard
 "Carina" (Larz-Kristerz song), a 2008 song by Swedish band Larz-Kristerz
 Carina Press, the digital-only publishing house from Harlequin Enterprises
 Carina (Marvel Cinematic Universe), a character in the Marvel Cinematic Universe

Storms
 Cyclone Carina, in the 2005–2006 South-West Indian Ocean cyclone season
 Tropical Storm Carina (2012), in the 2012 Pacific typhoon season
 Typhoon Nida (2016), a 2016 Pacific typhoon known as Severe Tropical Storm Carina in the Philippines

Other uses
 Carina, a Latin word for the keel of a ship or for its entire hull
 Carina Rugby League Football Club
 Toyota Carina, an automobile
 USS Carina (AK-74), a 1942 United States Navy cargo ship used in World War II
 Sailing yacht Carina, which disappeared off the Dublin coast in 1944
 Sailing yacht Carina II, which won the 1955 and 1957 Fastnet Races skippered by USA sailor Richard Nye

See also
Cairina, a genus of duck
Cariña, a variant of Carib language
Carinae, an area of ancient Rome
Carine (disambiguation)
Karina (disambiguation)